Olav Engebretsen, also Olaf Engebretsen (December 25, 1905 – March 30, 1988) was a Norwegian film editor and director.

Engebretsen was primarily active as a film editor from 1941 to 1962. The films that he edited include Den forsvundne pølsemaker (1941), Jeg drepte!, (1942), and Line (1961). He received the Norwegian Film Critics Award in 1961 for his editing of Line. In 1954 he directed the films Troll i ord and I moralens navn.

Engebretsen is buried in the Cemetery of Our Saviour in Oslo.

Filmography

Editor
1941: Den forsvundne pølsemaker
1942: Jeg drepte!
1942: Det æ'kke te å tru
1943: Vigdis
1943: Sangen til livet
1944: Kommer du, Elsa?
1946: Om kjærligheten synger de
1947: Sankt Hans fest
1948: Trollfossen
1949: I takt med tiden
1949: Jorden rundt på to timer
1951: Vi gifter oss
1951: Skadeskutt
1952: Haakon VII – Norges konge i krig og fred
1952: Andrine og Kjell
1952: De VI olympiske vinterleker Oslo 1952
1952: Jorden rundt på to timer
1952: Det kunne vært deg
1952: Trine!
1952: Vi vil skilles
1954: Kasserer Jensen
1956: Gylne ungdom
1957: Peter van Heeren
1957: Selv om de er små
1959: 5 loddrett
1961: Et øye på hver finger
1961: Line
1970: Skulle det dukke opp flere lik er det bare å ringe

Director
1954: Troll i ord
1954: I moralens navn

References

External links
 
 Olav Engebretsen at Norsk filmografi
 Olav Engebretsen at Filmfront
 Olav Engebretsen at the Danish Film Institute

1905 births
1988 deaths
Norwegian film directors
Norwegian film editors
Burials at the Cemetery of Our Saviour